The 1990 Camden Council election took place on 3 May 1990 to elect members of Camden London Borough Council in London, England.  The whole council was up for election.  Labour comfortably stayed in overall control of the council, despite the Conservatives gaining three seats at their expense in Swiss Cottage. The Green Party came third in vote share with 13% of the vote, but won no seats.

Election result

|}

Ward results

Adelaide

Belsize

Bloomsbury

Brunswick

Camden

Castlehaven

Caversham

Chalk Farm

Fitzjohns

Fortune Green

Frognal

Gospel Oak

Grafton

Hampstead Town

Highgate

Holborn

Kilburn

King's Cross

Priory

Regent's Park

St John's

St Pancras

Somers Town

South End

Swiss Cottage

West End

References

 

1990
1990 London Borough council elections